This national electoral calendar for 2019 lists the national/federal elections held in 2019 in all sovereign states and their dependent territories. By-elections are excluded, though national referendums are included.

February
3 February: El Salvador, President
10 February: Switzerland, Referendum
23 February: Nigeria, President, House of Representatives and Senate
24 February: 
Cuba, Constitutional Referendum
Moldova, Parliament and Referendum
Senegal, President
25 February: British Virgin Islands, Legislature

March
3 March: Estonia, Parliament
5 March: Federated States of Micronesia, Parliament and Referendum
10 March: 
Guinea-Bissau, Parliament
North Korea, Parliament
16 March: Slovakia, President (1st round)
24 March: 
Comoros, President
Ecuador, 
Thailand, Parliament
30 March: 
Slovakia, President (2nd round)
U.S. Virgin Islands, Referendum
31 March: Ukraine, President (1st round)

April
3 April: Solomon Islands, Parliament
6 April: Maldives, Parliament
7 April: Andorra, Parliament
9 April: Israel, Parliament
11 April: India, House of the People (1st phase)
14 April: Finland, Parliament
17 April: Indonesia, President, House of Representatives and Senate
18 April: India, House of the People (2nd phase)
20–22 April: Egypt, Constitutional Referendum
21 April: 
North Macedonia, President (1st round)
Ukraine, President (2nd round)
23 April: India, House of the People (3rd phase)
28 April: 
Benin, Parliament
Spain, Congress of Deputies
29 April: India, House of the People (4th phase)

May
5 May: 
North Macedonia, President (2nd round)
Panama, President and Parliament
6 May: India, House of the People (5th phase)
8 May: 
Belize, Referendum
South Africa, National Assembly
12 May: 
India, House of the People (6th phase)
Lithuania, President (1st round) and Referendum
New Caledonia, Legislature
13 May: Philippines, House of Representatives and Senate
18 May: Australia, House of Representatives and Senate
19 May: 
India, House of the People (7th phase)
Switzerland, Referendums
21 May: Malawi, President and Parliament (presidential election nullified)
24 May: Ireland, Constitutional Referendum
26 May: 
Belgium, Federal Chamber of Representatives
Lithuania, President (2nd round)
Romania, Referendum
27 May: Madagascar, National Assembly

June
2 June: San Marino, Referendums
5 June: Denmark, Parliament
9 June: 
Kazakhstan, President
South Ossetia, Parliament
16 June: Guatemala, President (1st round) and Parliament
22 June: Mauritania, President

July
7 July: Greece, Parliament
21 July: 
Japan, House of Councillors
Ukraine, Parliament

August
11 August: Guatemala, President (2nd round)
24 August: Nauru, Parliament
25 August: Abkhazia, President (1st round)
31 August: Faroe Islands, Legislature

September
8 September: Abkhazia, President (2nd round) (election nullified)
9 September: Tuvalu, Parliament
15 September: Tunisia, President (1st round)
17 September: Israel, Parliament
28 September: Afghanistan, President
29 September: Austria, National Council

October
5 October: United Arab Emirates, Parliament
6 October: 
Kosovo, Parliament
Portugal, Parliament
Tunisia, Parliament
13 October: 
Poland, Sejm and Senate
Tunisia, President (2nd round)
15 October: Mozambique, President and Parliament
17 October: Gibraltar, Legislature
20 October: 
Bolivia, President, Chamber of Deputies and Senate (election nullified)
Switzerland, 
21 October: Canada, House of Commons
23 October: Botswana, Parliament
27 October: 
Argentina, President, Chamber of Deputies and Senate
Oman, Consultative Assembly
Uruguay, President (1st round), Chamber of Deputies, Senate and Constitutional Referendum

November
3 November: Switzerland, 
5 November: Federated States of Micronesia, Constitutional Convention
6 November: Pitcairn Islands, Mayor and Legislature
7 November: Mauritius, Parliament
10 November: 
Romania, President (1st round)
Spain, Chamber of Deputies
Switzerland, 
16 November: Sri Lanka, President
17 November:
Belarus, House of Representatives
Switzerland, 
18 November: 
Marshall Islands, Parliament
Montserrat, Legislature
23 November – 7 December: Bougainville, Independence Referendum
24 November: 
Guinea-Bissau, President (1st round)
Liechtenstein, Referendum
Romania, President (2nd round)
Switzerland, 
Uruguay, President (2nd round)
27 November: Namibia, President and National Assembly

December
6 December: Dominica, Parliament
8 December: San Marino, Parliament
12 December: 
Algeria, President
United Kingdom, House of Commons
22 December: 
Croatia, President (1st round)
Uzbekistan, Legislative Chamber (1st round)
29 December: Guinea-Bissau, President (2nd round)

Indirect elections
The following indirect elections of heads of state and the upper houses of bicameral legislatures took place through votes in elected lower houses, unicameral legislatures, or electoral colleges: 
20 February: Bosnia and Herzegovina, House of Peoples
14 March: Democratic Republic of the Congo, Senate
1 April: San Marino, Captains Regent
2 April: Malta, President
28 April: Spain, Senate
29–30 April: Malaysia, Senate
11 May: Federated States of Micronesia, President
22 May: South Africa, President
26 May: Belgium, Senate
27 May: Netherlands, Senate
29 May: Latvia, President
7 June and 18 July: India, Council of States
25 August: Macau, Chief Executive
27 August: Nauru, President
16–30 September: Rwanda, Senate
1 October: San Marino, Captains Regent
10 October: Cuba, President and Council of State
6 November and 17 December: Austria, Federal Council
7 November: Belarus, Council of the Republic
10 November: Spain, Senate
2 December: Mauritius, President
11 December: Switzerland, Federal Council

See also
2019 in politics and government

References

National
National
Political timelines of the 2010s by year
National